O Shudder is the fourth studio album by English indie rock band Dutch Uncles, released on 23 February 2015.

Track listing
All lyrics by Duncan Wallis, all music by Robin Richards

Personnel
Dutch Uncles
Peter Broadhead - electric guitar, marimba
Andy Proudfoot - drums, backing vocals
Robin Richards - bass guitar, vibraphone, backing vocals
Daniel Spedding - electric guitar
Duncan Wallis - lead vocals, piano

Additional musicians
John Purton - violin
Jote Osahn - violin
Natalie Purton - viola
Margit van der Zwan - cello
Rachael Gladwin - harp
Daniel Thompson - flute, clarinet, oboe, bass clarinet

Technical staff
Brendan Williams - recording and production
Phil Bulleyment - engineering, mixing
George Atkins - mastering

References

2015 albums
Dutch Uncles albums
Memphis Industries albums